Serine/threonine kinase 17a is a protein that in humans is encoded by the STK17A gene.

Function 

This gene is a member of the death-associated protein (DAP) kinase-related apoptosis-inducing protein kinase family and encodes an autophosphorylated nuclear protein with a protein kinase domain. The protein has apoptosis-inducing activity.

In a recent study the gene (among others) shows a major role in centenarians longer lifespan.

References

Further reading